Nurmuiža Castle is a castle in Lauciene Parish, in the historical region of Courland, in western Latvia.

Today's use 
Since 2004 the castle has been managed by "Nurmuižas pils" Ltd.  and is again in private ownership.

See also
List of castles in Latvia

References

External links

Castles in Latvia
Talsi Municipality